Kutruwal is a town located in the Punjab province of Pakistan. It is located at 31°8'30N 73°11'30E with an altitude of 172 metres (567 feet). Neighbouring settlements include Kot Rajput and Risalapur.

References

Populated places in Lahore District